Jimmie Crane (1910–1998; born Loreto Domenic Fraieli) was an American songwriter and business owner from Providence, Rhode Island. He is known for composing songs performed by Glenn Miller and his Orchestra, Liberace, Doris Day, and Elvis Presley.

Biography
Crane was born on August 1, 1910, as Loreto Fraieli. Crane's career as a songwriter began when "It's Great To Be An American," a song written by Crane and Ray Muffs became part of Glenn Miller and his Orchestra's repertoire in 1941. In the late 1940s, Crane met songwriter Al Jacobs, and they became a songwriting team. Their songs began to gain popularity with Tommy Mara's recording "I'll Try" and "Bella Mia," with "Bella Mia" being their first charting song in 1953.

In 1954, their popular song "If I Give My Heart to You", written with Milt Gabler, was recorded by Connee Boswell. Denise Lor and Doris Day followed with their own renditions that year. The song would later be recorded by Bing Crosby, Duke Ellington, Kitty Kallen, and Nat King Cole, among others. That year, "I Need You Now", also written by Jimmie Crane and Al Jacobs, was recorded by Eddie Fisher and reached #1 on the Billboard and Cash Box charts on November 3, 1954. The song was also featured on Your Hit Parade. Crane and Jacobs' song "Hurt" was first recorded by Roy Hamilton in 1954 and gained popularity on the R&B Charts. The song would be covered most popularly by Timi Yuro and enter the Billboard Top 100. Elvis Presley covered "Hurt" shortly before his death. Among others, Bobby Vinton, Peabo Bryson, Liberace, and Carly Simon recorded versions of the song.

During his career as a songwriter, Crane also started and managed a jewelry company, Colonial Novelty, in Providence, Rhode Island. Crane was convicted of federal income tax evasion involving Colonial Novelty in 1976. Crane continued writing music throughout his life. He died in 1998.

Awards 

 1982 - Rhode Island Heritage Hall of Fame
1987 - ASCAP Most Performed Country Songs
 2013 - Rhode Island Music Hall of Fame

Selected discography 

This table is based largely on the discography compiled from "The Jimmie Crane Songography" written by Alan "Big Al" Pavlow and Rick Bellaire in honor of Jimmie Crane's 2013 induction into the Rhode Island Music Hall of Fame.

References 

Songwriters from Rhode Island
Musicians from Providence, Rhode Island
1910 births
1998 deaths